Marat Stanislavovich Butuyev (born 8 May 1992) is a Russian professional football player.

Club career
He played for FC Alania Vladikavkaz in the 2012–13 Russian Cup game against FC Tyumen on 27 September 2012.

He made his Russian Football National League debut for Alania on 12 August 2013 in a game against FC Salyut Belgorod.

References

External links
 
 
 
 

1992 births
Living people
Russian footballers
Association football defenders
FC Spartak Vladikavkaz players
Russian expatriate footballers
Expatriate footballers in Kazakhstan
FC Atyrau players
Expatriate footballers in Georgia (country)
Expatriate footballers in Armenia
Kazakhstan Premier League players